The 1995–96 Bradley Braves men's basketball team represented Bradley University as a member of the Missouri Valley Conference during the 1995–96 NCAA Division I men's basketball season. Led by head coach Jim Molinari, the Braves finished the season with a 22–8 record (15–3 MVC). They earned an at-large bid to the NCAA tournament as No. 8 seed in the East Region where they fell to Stanford in the opening round.

Roster

Schedule

|-
!colspan=9 style=| Regular season

|-
!colspan=9 style=| Missouri Valley Tournament

|-
!colspan=9 style=| NCAA Tournament

|-

Awards and honors
Anthony Parker  Missouri Valley Conference Player of the Year

References

Bradley Braves men's basketball seasons
Bradley
Brad
Brad
Bradley